SABC Education is a South African educational television channel owned by the South African Broadcasting Corporation (SABC).

History
In 1991, TV2, TV3, and TV4 were combined into a new service called CCV (Contemporary Community Values). A third channel was introduced known as TSS, or TopSport Surplus, TopSport being the brand name for the SABC's sports coverage, but this was replaced by NNTV (National Network TV), an educational, non-commercial channel, in 1993.

Established in 1996, SABC Education is a SABC business unit responsible for delivering the educational mandate of the public broadcaster.

In 2012, The SABC announced plans to launch it as a standalone channel alongside 14 other channels the public broadcaster planned to launch on their long-awaited DTT platforms alongside SABC 4, SABC 5, SABC Movies, and SABC Sport.

In 2015, SABC Education partnered up with Tuluntulu to launch the brand as an online channel alongside SABC Children.

In 2018, the SABC downsized its unfunded DTT plans to 9 channels with SABC Sport and Education present in that portfolio. They also launched a virtual academy for the brand to assist matriculants with their studies and equip them with the necessary skills to work independently.

In 2020, the COVID-19 pandemic forced the shutdown of most schools, and SABC rolled out SABC Education over DTT and YouTube from May 4, adding more platforms as time went on. In November 2022, SABC  in partnership with Hisense Group  South Africa Launched SABC Plus. SABC has been unable to add the channel to the satellite services DStv and StarSat.

Programming 

The content found on the 24/7 channel is either archived or found on SABC 1–3.

See also 
 List of South African media
 List of South African television channels

References

External links

Television stations in South Africa
Television channels and stations established in 1996
Afrikaans-language television